Moti Nagar is a neighbourhood located in the West Delhi district of Delhi, India.  The Ring Road is also nearby, as well as Punjabi Bagh (which is half a kilometre from Moti Nagar) and the Moti Nagar market. 

This locality has 100 acres of the green park known as DDA district park Swatantra Bharat Mills, positioned adjacent to the DLF Capital Greens.

References

Neighbourhoods in Delhi